Gohirakhol is a small village between Bhapur and Dhenkanal, India. It is about 7 km from Dhenkanal.

Income
People in Gohirakhol primarily receive their income from farming, working in Jute Mills, and working in various shops.

Post Office
 Bhaliabol Kateni

References

External links

Villages in Dhenkanal district